The Jesse C. Bickle House, also known as The Maples, is a historic house in Crete, Nebraska. It was built by homesteader Jesse C. Bickle as a one-story log house in 1864, and a second story was added in the 1870s. Bickle owned a brickyard in Crete and a store in Pleasant Hill. The house was designed in the Carpenter Gothic architectural style. It was purchased by Milton O. Smith in 1923, and renamed The Maples. It has been listed on the National Register of Historic Places since November 23, 1977.

References

National Register of Historic Places in Saline County, Nebraska
Carpenter Gothic houses in the United States
Houses completed in 1864